The  is a public wholesale fish, fruit, and vegetable market in Narita, Chiba, Japan. It is located near Narita International Airport.

History
In 1974, Narita City opened the public wholesale market to meet the demand of a growing population resulting from the opening of Narita International Airport in 1978.

Operations

The market opens most mornings (except Sundays, holidays and some Wednesdays). The tuna auction starts around 05:30. Most of the 200 shops in the market close by the early afternoon. Reservations are required to observe the tuna auctions.

References

External links
  

Buildings and structures in Chiba Prefecture
Wholesale markets
Narita, Chiba